The First Glove  is a 1946 Soviet sports comedy film directed by Andrey Frolov  about young boxer Nikita Krutikov.

Plot

Cast 
 Vladimir Volodin as Ivan   Privalov 
 Anastasia Zuyeva as Privalova 
 Ivan Pereverzev as Nikita Krutikov  
 Nadezhda Cherednichenko as Nina Grekova 
 Sergei Blinnikov as Porfiriy Mikhaylovich Koshelev 
 Vladimir Gribkov as Shishkin  
 Anatoly Stepanov as Yury Rogov  
 Tatyana Govorkova as Rogova, his mother  
 Afanasy Belov as Afanasy Lubyago, trainer 
 Pavel Olenev as Savelich, arena manager

References

External links 
  

1946 films
1940s Russian-language films
Russian boxing films
Soviet sports comedy films
Soviet black-and-white films
Mosfilm films
1940s sports comedy films
1946 comedy films
Soviet boxing films
Russian black-and-white films